Wołczyn  is a town in Kluczbork County, Opole Voivodeship, southern Poland, with 5,907 inhabitants . It is located within the historic region of Lower Silesia.

History

The name of the town is derived from the Polish word wół, which means "ox". In the early 14th-century Liber fundationis episcopatus Vratislaviensis the town appeared under the Latinized name Welczyn. The town was probably founded on the site of a former Slavic settlement. It was granted town rights in 1261. It was part of various duchies of fragmented Poland. Until 1294 it was part of the Duchy of Wrocław/Breslau, afterwards the Duchy of Głogów/Glogau until 1312, Duchy of Namysłów/Namslau until 1320, Duchy of Oleśnica/Oels until 1343, Duchy of Brzeg/Brieg until 1436 and afterwards the Duchy of Oleśnica again. It remained under the rule of the Piast dynasty until 1495, and afterwards, for about 300 years, the town was owned by the magnate Posadowski family, under the suzerainty of the Bohemian Kingdom, a part of the Holy Roman Empire, until 1526, when the Habsburgs inherited the Bohemian Crown.

The town was located on a trade route connecting Kraków and Wrocław. The population made a living from agriculture, crafts and trade. Five annual fairs were held in Wołczyn, and crops and handicrafts were sold to customers not only from Silesia, but also from neighboring Greater Poland. In the 15th century the Czech Hussites and in the 17th century Polish Brethren settled in Wołczyn. In the 16th century, a municipal school known for its high level of education was established there, and in the 18th and early 19th centuries there was a well-known proseminar for Polish Lutherans, later moved to Kluczbork.

In 1742 the town was annexed by the Kingdom of Prussia. On 1 October 1868, the town was connected to a railway line. By 1907 Wołczyn had a water supply network. In the final stages of World War II, from 19 to 21 January 1945, fights were fought for the town between Nazi Germany and the Soviets. As a result, 40% of the town's buildings were in ruins. At the end of the war, the German population of the town was expelled leaving the region denuded, the region was then inhabited by a massive influx of Polish settlers and was annexed to Poland.

Since 1994, the city has hosted an annual "Spotkania Młodych" (Meeting of Youth). It is organized by the Order of Friars Minor Capuchin.

Twin towns – sister cities
See twin towns of Gmina Wołczyn.

References

External links
 http://www.wolczyn.pl/
 Jewish Community in Wołczyn on Virtual Shtetl

Cities and towns in Opole Voivodeship
Kluczbork County
Cities in Silesia